Mann's World is the debut studio album by American rapper Mann, released through Def Jam Records and Beluga Heights on August 2, 2011. The album is preceded by the singles "Buzzin'" and "The Mack" which were released in October 2010 and May 2011, respectively.

Mann's World features production styles crossing the genres of hip-hop and rap and was produced by J.R. Rotem.

Background and singles
In 2008, the song "Ghetto Girl" featuring Sean Kingston was released. On April 16, 2010, the first single "Text" featuring Jason Derulo was issued.

The second single from Mann's World, "Buzzin'", is based on producer J.R. Rotem's chopped 'n' screwed sample of the 1986 Nu Shooz pop/soul song "I Can't Wait" and Ohio Players' 1973 single "Funky Worm". It was released on October 25, 2010, and the song climbed into the Top 20 on Rhythmic stations across the nation and Top 10 in Los Angeles, Miami, Phoenix, Denver and more.

The third single, "The Mack" featuring Snoop Dogg and Iyaz, was released on May 23, 2011. Mann said prior to the release of the album: "this album is going to be a mixture between Chronic, 2001 and Graduation, I want nothing less than perfection".

Track listing 

Notes
 The iTunes Store bonus track version contains the music videos for "Buzzin' (Remix)" and "The Mack".
 Track 2, "Gold Herringbone", contains elements of "Nuthin' but a 'G' Thang", as written and performed by Dr. Dre and Snoop Dogg.
 Track 4, "Buzzin' (Remix)", is based around samples of Nu Shooz' 1986 recording "I Can't Wait", written by John Smith.
 Track 3, "The Mack", is a cover version (featuring vocals from Snoop Dogg and Iyaz) of the original "Return of the Mack", as written and performed by Mark Morrison.
 Track 6, "Get It Girl", mostly samples the "Beverly Hills Cop theme", this song has also been sampled by producer J. R. Rotem for the song "Strobelight" by K-Young, and featured Mann. The song includes a sample of "Axel F", as produced by Harold Faltermeyer. The song also samples Family Guy's Peter Griffin for the line.
 Track 7, "Reminisce", samples the single "They Reminisce Over You (T.R.O.Y.)" by Pete Rock & CL Smooth. The Saxophone is played by Jason Goldman and features uncredited vocals by Ty$.

Charts

Release history

References

Mann (rapper) albums
2011 debut albums
Albums produced by J. R. Rotem